Sergei Borodin may refer to:

 Sergei Borodin (footballer, born 1988), Russian football player
 Sergei Borodin (footballer, born 1999), Russian football player